State Road 23 (SR 23), also known as the First Coast Expressway, is an outer bypass around the southwest quadrant of Jacksonville. , the first phase has been built, linking the Middleburg area to Interstate 10 near Whitehouse.

The ultimate plan is for a $1.8 billion, four-lane toll expressway continuing southeast to Green Cove Springs and east to Interstate 95 near the World Golf Village, to be constructed in two phases. Construction of the section from Middleburg to just north of SR 16 near Green Cove Springs began in 2019 and is expected to wrap up in the middle of the 2020s. Construction of the final section, from near Green Cove Springs and across the St. Johns River then continuing east through fast-growing northern St. Johns County to I-95 is expected to begin in 2023 and be completed around the end of the 2020s decade.

Route description

History

The plans for connecting I-10 to SR 21 (Blanding Blvd) date back to 1979. SR 23 was originally planned as a toll road by Florida's Turnpike Enterprise to meet those plans, but those plans fell through.

The Jacksonville Transportation Authority and Clay County worked together to connect Branan Field Road in Clay County and Chaffee Road in Duval County. By 2003, the Duval County section was open, and connected south to Branan Field Road in Clay County. By late 2004, the Clay County section was added. Currently the entire route stretches from I-10 in Jacksonville to a point on Branan Field Road north of Middleburg.

The project was formerly known as the First Coast Outer Beltway and the Branan Field-Chaffee Expressway, but its current name is the First Coast Expressway.

Future
The beltway when finished will contain 17 interchanges and a new bridge across the St. Johns River in place of the current two-lane Shands Bridge.

Funding

Funding for the $1.8 billion project will be competitively bid as a Public Private Partnership (PPP) opportunity for private sector businesses. By using a PPP and innovative contracting solutions, the project will be built years earlier than with traditional contracting methods. The awarded contractor(s) will serve as the concessionaire to design, build, finance, operate and maintain the beltway. The Florida Department of Transportation (FDOT) is currently engaging private contractors in a competitive bidding process.  The I-595 Corridor Express PPP with I-595 Express LLC was the first of its kind in Florida, opening years ahead of schedule. The beltway is the largest infrastructure project in Florida History.

In early 2011, FDOT abandoned the plan to find a private company to build the entire 46.6 mile beltway and just focus on building the 15 mile section between I-10 and SR 21 (Blanding Blvd). This section is partly built and would need flyovers built and widening done for the expressway to be complete. It is expected to cost around $291 million and would be a tollway.

In August 2011, FDOT announced that the Florida's Turnpike Enterprise will be taking on the $291 million project of turning the 15-mile stretch into a tollway. Construction started on September 10, 2012 and set to be completed in fall 2018.

Construction on the second phase of the expressway, from SR 21 (Blanding Blvd) to Green Cove Springs, is expected to start around January 2019. The third and final phase of the project, which includes replacement of the Shands Bridge, is anticipated to start in 2023.

Tolling
According to FDOT, all tolls will be done electronically and compatible with SunPass used in other parts of the state with no toll booths. There will be two exceptions to the tollroad. The  section between I-10 and New World Avenue will not be tolled to help promote growth in the Cecil Commerce Center. Also people living around the Shands Bridge area will be exempt from tolls on the Shands Bridge crossing the St. Johns River.

Major intersections
Tolls are collected between each exit south of Exit 42.

References

External links

 

023
023
023
023
Toll roads in Florida
Westside, Jacksonville
Expressways in Duval County, Florida